Henry George Phillips (born 1882) was an English professional footballer who played as a forward.

A prolific marksman in Stoke whilst an iron foundry worker, Phillips moved to Grimsby Town after a spell with Lincoln City, during which he scored on his league debut, the second goal in a 3–0 home win against Middlesbrough on the opening day of the 1899–1900 season.  He went on to play for the Mariners 21 times, scoring 9 goals.  He finished the 1904–05 season as joint top scorer with seven goals despite missing several games with a knee injury. He was a versatile attacker, making appearances across the front line over the course of his career, with the majority being at centre forward.

His form during the 1904–05 season drew an unsuccessful £150 bid from Middlesbrough, though at the season's end he was allowed to join New Brompton as a free agent.

Likened in style to Joe Rogers, Phillips was described as "a bustler, quick on the ball, one of the cleverest with his head".

References

1882 births
Footballers from Staffordshire
English footballers
Association football forwards
Sandford Hill F.C. players
Lincoln City F.C. players
Stockton F.C. players
Grimsby Town F.C. players
Gillingham F.C. players
English Football League players
Year of death missing